Basketball was one of the 20 sports disciplines held in the 1978 Asian Games in Bangkok, Thailand. China won their 1st title by beating last edition's finalist South Korea in the championship match. The games were held from December 9 to 20, 1978.

Medalists

Medal table

Results

Men

Preliminary round

Group A

Group B

Group C

Classification 7th–14th
 The results and the points of the matches between the same teams that were already played during the preliminary round shall be taken into account for the classification round.

Final round
 The results and the points of the matches between the same teams that were already played during the preliminary round shall be taken into account for the final round.

Final standing

Women

Final standing

References 
 Men's Results
 Women's Results

 
Basketball
1978
1978 in Asian basketball
International basketball competitions hosted by Thailand